Hugo Teofilus Manninen (5 August 1902, Taipalsaari – 26 November 1990) was a Finnish consumers' co-operative manager and politician. He served as a Member of the Parliament of Finland from 1945 to 1970, representing the Finnish People's Democratic League (SKDL).

References

1902 births
1990 deaths
People from Taipalsaari
People from Viipuri Province (Grand Duchy of Finland)
Finnish People's Democratic League politicians
Members of the Parliament of Finland (1945–48)
Members of the Parliament of Finland (1948–51)
Members of the Parliament of Finland (1951–54)
Members of the Parliament of Finland (1954–58)
Members of the Parliament of Finland (1958–62)
Members of the Parliament of Finland (1962–66)
Members of the Parliament of Finland (1966–70)
Finnish people of World War II